Memanpur is an inhabited place in the Goghat II CD block  in the Arambagh subdivision of Hooghly district in the Indian state of West Bengal.

Geography

Area overview
The Arambagh subdivision, presented in the map alongside, is divided into two physiographic parts – the Dwarakeswar River being the dividing line. The western part is upland and rocky – it is extension of the terrain of neighbouring Bankura district. The eastern part is flat alluvial plain area.  The railways, the roads and flood-control measures have had an impact on the area. The area is overwhelmingly rural with 94.77% of the population living in rural areas and 5.23% of the population living in urban areas.

Note: The map alongside presents some of the notable locations in the subdivision. All places marked in the map are linked in the larger full screen map.

Location
Memanpur is located at 

Memanpur was  not identified as a separate place in 2011 census and is not marked in Google maps. However, an old Shyamsundar pancharatna mandir is indicated at the coordinates marked above. Memanpur Primary School is located nearby.

Culture
David J. McCutchion mentions a pancha ratna Syama Sundara temple, built possibly in the 17th century, at Memanpr.

Memanpur picture gallery

References

External links

Villages in Hooghly district